Wolfgang Treu may refer to:
 Wolfgang Treu (politician)
 Wolfgang Treu (cinematographer)